Balderas is an underground station on the Mexico City Metro. It is located in the Cuauhtémoc borough in the center of Mexico City. It is a transfer station along Lines 1 and 3.

Name and iconography
The station receives its name from the nearby Balderas street, which in turn was named in honor of Lucas Balderas, a Mexican military officer that participated in the Mexican–American War and was killed at the Battle of Molino del Rey in 1847. It is said that his last words were "poor country of mine".

The station pictogram depicts the colonial-era cannon preserved on the nearby Plaza de La Ciudadela. The cannon is a reminder of the Ten Tragic Days, which was a period a little bit longer than 10 days in which a coup the democratically elected government of Francisco I. Madero took place. This chapter would end with the murder of  President Madero and Vice-President José María Pino Suárez, as well as the rise to the presidency of Victoriano Huerta.

General information
Nearby Metro Balderas are some interesting places, like La Ciudadela market, filled with Mexican handicrafts, the José Vasconcelos Central Library of Mexico City,  and facilities of broadcaster Televisa. Next to the library lies a tianguis (street market) full of books old and new, comics, collectibles, etc.

This station has an information desk and facilities for the disabled.  It also displays a plaque unveiled on 19 September 2004, celebrating Mexican rock musician Rockdrigo González, killed exactly 19 years earlier in the 1985 Mexico City earthquake and composer of a song titled "Metro Balderas". In September 2011 a real-size bronze statue of Rockdrigo was also unveiled inside the station.

Although this station is totally underground, cellular phone signals (GSM and TDMA for several providers) are able to reach the platform. The station also has charging stations for mobile devices.

History
Metro Balderas was opened on 4 September 1969, as part of  the first stage of Line 1, going from Chapultepec to Zaragoza.

The station became the network's second transfer station, when the first stretch of Line 3, from Tlatelolco to Hospital General, was opened in November 1970.

Incidents
On Friday, 18 September 2009 a shooting occurred on the platform. A man was tagging one of the station walls with a marker, therefore, he was confronted by a police officer. He reacted by taking out a gun and killing the officer and a construction worker who tried to disarm him, he also left five more wounded. The man later claimed that he committed the killings "in the name of god" and was sentenced to 151 years in prison.

On 29 December 2018, a woman gave birth to a child inside the station, at the Line 1 platforms, helped by personnel of the Mexican Red Cross.

Nearby
Biblioteca de México, public library.
Escuela Libre de Derecho, law school.
Televisa Chapultepec headquarters.
Parque Tolsá, park.
Centro Escolar Revolución, elementary school.

Exits

Line 1
North: Tolsá street and Balderas, Centro
South: Avenida Niños Héroes and Avenida Chapultepec, Colonia Doctores

Line 3
East: Avenida Arcos de Belén, Colonia Doctores
Southeast: Avenida Niños Héroes and Dr. Río de la Loza street, Colonia Doctores

Station layout

Ridership

Gallery

References

External links 
 
 

Balderas
Railway stations opened in 1969
1969 establishments in Mexico
Railway stations opened in 1970
1970 establishments in Mexico
Mexico City Metro stations in Cuauhtémoc, Mexico City
Mexico City Metro Line 3 stations
Accessible Mexico City Metro stations